Fibrinoid necrosis is a specific pattern of irreversible, uncontrolled cell death that occurs when antigen-antibody complexes are deposited in the walls of blood vessels along with fibrin. It is common in the immune-mediated vasculitides which are a result of type III hypersensitivity. When stained with hematoxylin and eosin, they appear brightly eosinophilic and smudged.

Diseases 
Fibrinoid necrosis is not limited to the immune-mediated vasculitides; many pathologic processes can lead to areas of fibrinoid necrosis. In systemic lupus erythematosus, the dermis is often affected by fluid accumulation and inflammation around the small vessels in the skin, which may show prominent fibrinoid necrosis. Also it's seen in rheumatoid nodules with similar pathology. Also seen in Serum Sickness(Type III hypersensitivity reaction)

References 

Histopathology
Necrosis
Cellular processes